The 1990–91 Lancashire Cup was the seventy-eighth occasion on which the completion had been held. Widnes won the trophy  by beating Salford by the score of 24-18 in the final. The match was played at Central Park, Wigan, (historically in the county of Lancashire). The attendance was 7,485 and receipts were £36,867.00.

Background 

The total entrants remained the same as last season, i.e. at 17.
This necessitated the need for a preliminary round (consisting of just 1 game. The first round (proper) then involved 16 clubs, thus removing the need of  any  “blank” or “dummy” fixtures or any byes.

Competition and results

Preliminary round 
Involved  1 match and 2 clubs

Round 1 
Involved  8 matches (with no byes) and 16 clubs

Round 2 - Quarter-finals 
Involved 4 matches and 7 clubs

Round 3 – Semi-finals  
Involved 2 matches and 4 clubs

Final

Teams and scorers 

Scoring - Try = four points - Goal = two points - Drop goal = one point

The road to success 
(This chart excludes the match in the preliminary round)

Notes and comments 
1 * The first Lancashire Cup match to be played at Rochdale Hornets's new ground 
2 * The first Lancashire Cup match to be played on this ground, one of many used by Fulham during the nomadic period between 1985-1993
3 * The attendance is given as 11,708 in the official Widnes archives - RUGBYLEAGUEproject  gives the attendance as 12,028
4  * Central Park was the home ground of Wigan with a final capacity of 18,000, although the record attendance was  47,747 for Wigan v St Helens 27 March 1959

See also 
1990–91 Rugby Football League season
Rugby league county cups

References

External links
Saints Heritage Society
1896–97 Northern Rugby Football Union season at wigan.rlfans.com 
Hull&Proud Fixtures & Results 1896/1897
Widnes Vikings - One team, one passion Season In Review - 1896–97
The Northern Union at warringtonwolves.org

RFL Lancashire Cup
Lancashire Cup